The 2001–02 Pittsburgh Panthers men's basketball team represented the University of Pittsburgh in the 2001–02 NCAA Division I men's basketball season. Led by head coach Ben Howland, the Panthers finished with a record of 29–6. They received an at-large bid to the 2002 NCAA Division I men's basketball tournament where they lost in the Sweet Sixteen to Kent State.

References

Pittsburgh Panthers men's basketball seasons
Pittsburgh
Pittsburgh
Pittsburgh Pan
Pittsburgh Pan